Irene Fenwick (born Irene Frizell; September 5, 1887 – December 24, 1936) was an American stage and silent film actress. She was married to Lionel Barrymore from 1923 until her death in 1936. Fenwick has several surviving feature films from her productions for the Kleine-Edison Feature Film Service, which also has numerous surviving shorts in the Library of Congress. 

Years before marrying Lionel, Irene had dated Lionel's brother, John.

Life
Frizell was born in Chicago and began acting in local theater. She had a few chorus roles in London, including one in a musical comedy that won critics praise for her "nearly natural performance". In New York she met Broadway producer Charles Frohman who gave her the stage name Fenwick and the ingénue role in The Brass Bottle (1910). A vivacious redhead, adept at both drama and comedy, she had a forceful stage presence that belied her tiny stature of 4'11". She continued on stage in 1912 opposite Douglas Fairbanks in Hawthorne of the U.S.A.  The following year in the play The Family Cupboard, she was touted as a young actress with "the tact and intelligence of a veteran player". 

While on Broadway, she started working in silent films with producer George Kleine. Fenwick often played wronged women and vamps in films such as The Sentimental Lady (1915), The Woman Next Door (1915), A Coney Island Princess (1916), with her performance as Princess Zim-Zim highlighted as the films "chief force", and The Sin Woman (1917). Fenwick felt restricted by these film roles and returned to the stage. In the hit plays The Claw (1921) and Laugh, Clown, Laugh (1923) she co-starred with Lionel Barrymore, whom she married on June 14, 1923, after a brief engagement. It was his second marriage and her third. She retired in 1926 after her husband chose a Hollywood career.

Death
Fenwick died on Christmas Eve in 1936, at age 49 from complications of anorexia nervosa (called "overdieting" then). Barrymore was replaced by his brother John in his famous annual radio broadcast as Ebenezer Scrooge in A Christmas Carol for that year. He never remarried.

Filmography

References

External links

 
  passport photo of Irene Fenwick
 Article about Fenwick and Barrymore (with Tallulah Bankhead) shortly before her death

1887 births
1936 deaths
20th-century American actresses
Actresses from Chicago
American film actresses
American silent film actresses
American stage actresses
Barrymore family
Neurological disease deaths in California
Deaths from anorexia nervosa